The 1992 Yale Bulldogs football team represented Yale University in the 1992 NCAA Division I-AA football season.  The Bulldogs were led by 28th-year head coach Carmen Cozza, played their home games at the Yale Bowl and finished tied for sixth place in the Ivy League with a 2–5 record, 4–6 overall.

Schedule

References

Yale
Yale Bulldogs football seasons
Yale Bulldogs football